Marine Corps Air Station Beaufort or MCAS Beaufort  is a United States Marine Corps (USMC) air base located  northwest of the central business district of Beaufort, a city in Beaufort County, South Carolina, United States. About 4,700 personnel serve at the station, and it is home to four Marine Corps F/A-18 Hornet fighter-attack squadrons and one F-35B Lighting II training squadron.

History

Naval Air Station Beaufort was commissioned on June 15, 1943, for advanced training operations of anti-submarine patrols during World War II. It was deactivated in 1946 and reactivated in 1956.

On March 1, 1960, it was re-designated Marine Corps Air Station Beaufort.

On September 19, 1975, the airfield was named Merritt Field in honor of Major General Lewie G. Merritt, USMC, a 1917 graduate of The Citadel, The Military College of South Carolina. A native of Ridge Spring, Merritt was a Marine Aviation pioneer who served in both World Wars and commanded several major flying units in the South Pacific during World War II, after retirement he also served as legal counsel to the South Carolina Legislature.

The air station encompasses 6,900 acres (28 km²). It is also associated with a large air-to-air combat area off the coast of South Carolina and Georgia as well as a 5,200 acre (21 km²) air-to-ground combat and bombing range in McIntosh County, Georgia. Also attached to the base is the housing complex of Laurel Bay, three miles (5 km) from the station, that provides family housing for area servicemembers.

Formerly home to USMC F-8 Crusader and F-4 Phantom II operations, MCAS Beaufort currently hosts all active duty USMC F/A-18 air operations on the East Coast, said aircraft and squadrons being assigned to Marine Aircraft Group 31 (MAG-31). The mission of MCAS Beaufort is to provide support as an operational base for MAG-31 and its associated squadrons, Marine Corps support units and tenant U.S. Navy strike fighter squadrons. The mission of the Marine Aircraft Group is to conduct anti-air-warfare and offensive air support operations in support of Fleet Marine Forces from advanced bases, expeditionary airfields, or aircraft carriers and conduct such other air operations as may be directed. Two Navy F/A-18 strike fighter squadrons under the claimancy of Strike Fighter Wing Atlantic at NAS Oceana, Virginia were also previously  homeported at MCAS Beaufort. The population of the on-base "city" includes nearly 4,000 active-duty servicemembers and more than 700 civilian workers.

As is the case with many air bases, MCAS Beaufort hosts a bi-annual air show open to the public. In April 2007, a fatal crash occurred involving an aircraft from the Blue Angels demonstration team during the show.

MCAS Beaufort's nickname is "Fightertown East". MCAS Miramar in San Diego, California is the more commonly known "Fightertown", also called "Fightertown USA", the latter having acquired the nickname when it was under Navy control as NAS Miramar.

MCAS Beaufort's Dental Clinic shares a building with the Medical Clinic.  The Dental Clinic has five to seven dentists who support the squadrons' oral health care needs.

The 1979 film The Great Santini, based on a novel written by Pat Conroy which centered on MCAS Beaufort in the early 1960s, was filmed on base and in the local area.

Based units 
Flying and notable non-flying units based at MCAS Beaufort.

United States Marine Corps 
Marine Corps Installations – East

 Headquarters and Headquarters Squadron – UC-12F Huron

2nd Marine Aircraft Wing

 Marine Air Control Group 28
 Marine Air Control Squadron 2 (MACS-2) (Detachment A)
 Marine Aircraft Group 31
Marine All Weather Fighter Attack Squadron 224 (VMFA(AW)-224) – F/A-18D Hornet
 Marine All Weather Fighter Attack Squadron 533 (VMFA(AW)-533) – F/A-18D Hornet
 Marine Aviation Logistics Squadron 31 (MALS-31)
Marine Fighter Attack Squadron 115 (VMFA-115) – F/A-18A/C Hornet
Marine Fighter Attack Squadron 312 (VMFA-312) – F/A-18C/D Hornet
Marine Fighter Attack Training Squadron 501 (VMFAT-501) – F-35B Lightning II
 Marine Wing Support Detachment 273 (MWSD-273)
 Marine Aviation Training Support Group 42
 Marine Fighter Attack Training Squadron (VMFAT-501) Squadron Augment Unit – F-35B Lightning II

Aircraft on display at the entrance
135841 - North American FJ-3 Fury representing VMF-312
147772 - Douglas A-4C Skyhawk representing MALS-31
146963 - Vought F-8C Crusader representing VMF-122
152270 - McDonnell Douglas F-4N Phantom II representing VMFA-251
163157 - McDonnell Douglas F/A-18 Hornet representing VMFA-115

Education
The Department of Defense Education Activity (DoDEA) is the local school district for people living on the property of MCAS Beaufort. It operates Elliott Elementary School (PreKindergarten-Grade 2) and Bolden Elementary/Middle School (grades 3-8).

Beaufort County School District operates public high schools serving MCAS Beaufort, and in sum has the highest number of students, of any school system, affiliated with MCAS Beaufort.

See also

 List of United States Marine Corps installations
 List of airports in South Carolina

References

External links

 Official website of MCAS Beaufort
 MCAS Beaufort at GlobalSecurity.org
 

Airports in South Carolina
Buildings and structures in Beaufort, South Carolina
Military installations in South Carolina
Port Royal Island
active
1943 establishments in South Carolina